Tiago André Venâncio (born 19 July 1987) is a Portuguese freestyle swimmer. He competed at the 2004, 2008 and 2012 Summer Olympics in the individual 100 m and 200 m events with the best result of 26th place in 2004.

References

1987 births
Living people
Portuguese male swimmers
Portuguese male freestyle swimmers
Swimmers at the 2004 Summer Olympics
Swimmers at the 2008 Summer Olympics
Swimmers at the 2012 Summer Olympics
Olympic swimmers of Portugal
Sportspeople from Setúbal
20th-century Portuguese people
21st-century Portuguese people